Davka Corporation is a software company specializing in applications related to Jewish history, customs and traditions and the Hebrew language. Founded in 1982, Davka is notable as the publisher of several early games for the Apple II series of computers including The Lion's Share (1983 video game) by Robert Aaron and The Philistine Ploy by Robert Aaron and Alan Rosenbaum.  The company has published numerous software titles for the PC, Macintosh and Palm platforms including the ubiquitous Davkawriter Hebrew/English Word processor.

Name
The name Davka comes from a Hebrew word that is difficult to translate.  At times the intent is to say "exactly so"; often, the word "specifically" can be used as a synonym, but it has many other translations.

About
In the late 1990s and somewhat beyond, its major competitor was
Jerusalem-based Torah Educational Software.

Davkawriter
DavkaWriter is a Hebrew-English word processing program for Windows. (A Mac version is available as well.)

Its built-in tools include a dictionary, a thesaurus, and a translating tool. It comes with the complete Hebrew texts of the Bible and many other volumes of Jewish literature. Its spellchecker recognizes both English and Hebrew words.

DavkaWriter Platinum was reviewed in 2002, 2004 and 2006 issues of The Jewish Press, referring to  updated versions.

CD-ROM - Soncino Classics Collection
Davka also released a CD-ROM named Soncino Classics Collection that contains:
 Hebrew and English of Tanach
 Aramaic and English of the Soncino Talmud
 Soncino Midrash Rabbah
 Soncino Zohar

In addition to The New York Times ' 9 paragraph 1998 review, a full page was devoted in The Jewish Press to this CD in 2003.

See also
 Torah Educational Software
 Jewish Nonviolent video games

References

External links
 
 DavkaWriter website
 "Jewish software runs the gamut, from educational games to printing programs to advanced research tools for the scholar" : a JTA comparative overview

Companies based in Chicago
Hebrew language
Jewish media
Jewish printing and publishing
Judaism software
Privately held companies based in Illinois
Video game companies of the United States
Windows word processors